The Mental Capacity Act 2005 (c 9) is an Act of the Parliament of the United Kingdom applying to England and Wales.  Its primary purpose is to provide a legal framework for acting and making decisions on behalf of adults who lack the capacity to make particular decisions for themselves.

Key features of the Act

The five statutory principles
The five principles are outlined in the Section 1 of the Act. These are designed to protect people who lack capacity to make particular decisions, but also to maximise their ability to make decisions, or to participate in decision-making, as far as they are able to do so.

Summary of other key elements of the Act
 The Act makes provision for people to plan ahead for a time when they may need support. This introduces advance decisions to refuse treatment.
 The decision (or question) under consideration must be time and decision specific.
 The Act upholds the principle of Best Interest for the individual concerned.
 A Court of Protection will help with difficult decisions. The Office of the Public Guardian (formerly Public Guardianship Office), the administrative arm of the Court of Protection, will help the Act work.
 An Independent Mental Capacity Advocate (IMCA) service will provide help for people who have no intimate support network.
 S(44) of The Act makes it a criminal offence to wilfully neglect someone without capacity.
 The Act generally applies only to those over the age of 16 years, although may apply to some younger people if it is supposed that their capacity will continue to be impaired into adulthood.

Section 68: Commencement and extent
The following orders have been made under this section:
 The Mental Capacity Act 2005 (Commencement No.1) Order 2006 (S.I. 2006/2814 (C. 95))
 The Mental Capacity Act 2005 (Commencement No.1) (Amendment) Order 2006 (S.I. 2006/3473 (C. 133))
 The Mental Capacity Act 2005 (Commencement No. 2) Order 2007 (S.I. 2007/1897 (C. 72))
 The Mental Capacity Act 2005 (Commencement No. 1) (England and Wales) Order 2007 (S.I. 2007/563 (C. 24))
 Mental Capacity Act 2005 (Commencement) (Wales) Order 2007 (S.I. 2007/856 (W. 79) (C. 34))

Timetable of new features
The new measures that the Act introduced were:

April 2007
 A new criminal offence of wilful neglect of a person without capacity
 A new Independent Mental Capacity Advocacy Service in England
 A Code of Practice that tells people how to ensure they are following the Act
October 2007
 Extension of the Independent Mental Capacity Advocacy Service to Wales
 Lasting Powers of Attorney and deputies
 A new Court of Protection
 A new Office of the Public Guardian

Amendments
In response to the ruling by the European Court of Human Rights in HL v UK (2004) (the 'Bournewood' judgment) the Act was amended by the Mental Health Act 2007 in July that year. These additions are known as the Deprivation of Liberty Safeguards (DoLS), and were implemented in April 2009. These amendments created administrative procedures to ensure the Act's processes are observed in cases of adults who are, or may be, deprived of their liberty in care homes or hospitals, thus protecting health and social care providers from prosecution under human rights legislation.

Key elements of the DoLS are that the person must be provided with a representative and given the right to challenge the deprivation of liberty through the Court of Protection, and that there must be a mechanism for the deprivation of liberty to be reviewed and monitored regularly.

The DoLS were introduced in response to the Bournewood case, on which the European Court of Human Rights ruled in October 2004 (HL v United Kingdom) that a detention of an incapacitated patient which did not comply with Article 5 of the European Convention on Human Rights had taken place; in particular, a person who is detained must be told the reasons for the detention and must also, under Article 5(4), have the right of speedy access to a court to appeal against the detention.

Mental Capacity (Amendment) Bill 2019
The Mental Capacity Act was amended in May 2019.  This act will replace DoLS with a new legal framework called  Liberty Protection Safeguards (LPS).  These will be used for anyone 16 or above who lacks capacity rather than 18 as previously used in DoLS.  The "acid test' from the Cheshire West case remains, there is still no statuary definition of deprivation of liberty.  Target date for implementation was October 2020,    It was announced by Helen Whately, Minister for Care in July 2020 that the implementation would be delayed, with full implementation expected by April 2022.  Some of this delay was due to the Coronavirus disease 2019 pandemic.  During this period a draft Code of practice will be produced which will go out to Public consultation.

UK legislation 
 
 Explanatory notes to the Mental Capacity Act 2005.

References

Further reading 
 Atkinson, J. (2006) Private and Public Protection: Civil Mental Health Legislation, Edinburgh, Dunedin Academic Press

See also 
 Adults with Incapacity (Scotland) Act 2000
 Mental Health Act 1983
 Mental Health Act 2007

External links
 Department of Health summary
 Summary from direct.gov
 Easy Read Summary in Plain English
 Your statistical guide to the Mental Capacity Act 2005
 Factsheet 460: Mental Capacity Act 2005, Alzheimer's Society
 Factsheet 483: Deprivation of Liberty Safeguards (DoLS), Alzheimer's Society
 Protecting the Vulnerable? by Anna Raccoon
 Cross border incapacity: Will England and Wales find the tin opener? Schedule 3 to the Mental Capacity Act 2005

2005 in England
2005 in Wales
Acts of the Parliament of the United Kingdom concerning England and Wales
Mental health law in the United Kingdom
Welfare in England
Welfare in Wales
United Kingdom Acts of Parliament 2005
Capacity (law)